Hyperbranched aminosilica is a white powdery substance. The compound, also referred to as HAS can capture and keep CO2 gas due to its branch-like properties that enable amino sites at the tips of the branches to collect the gas. It is made from aziridine and mesoporous silica.

References

Silicon compounds
Amines